Ishan Malhotra (born 22 May 1984 in Srinagar, Jammu and Kashmir) is an Indian cricketer who played for the Chandigarh Lions in the Indian Cricket League (ICL) having previously represented Punjab cricket team. He currently plays for the Maratha Arabians in Abu Dhabi T10 league. 

He is a bowling all-rounder, who bats right-handed and played for Punjab between 2001 and 2007 before switching to the ICL. In that period he played nine first-class matches for his state scoring 224 runs and taking 33 wickets. He played 10 List A matches for his state and took four wickets and in four Twenty20 matches he took two wickets. He made his first-class debut against Assam and took figures of 7/59 (seven wickets and conceding 59 runs). 

He was picked by Deccan Chargers in the IPL but only played a solitary game for them during which he bowled a single over which was hit for 23 by Virender Sehwag who went onto score a 48 ball century. 

He played for Maratha Arabians during the 2021 Abu Dhabi T10 league appearing in 6 matches, scoring 36 runs but failing to take a wicket.

References

More information about Ishan Malhotra

1984 births
Indian cricketers
Punjab, India cricketers
Mumbai Indians cricketers
Deccan Chargers cricketers
Living people
ICL India XI cricketers
Chandigarh Lions cricketers